Matthew Wilder ( Weiner; January 24, 1953) is an American musician, singer, songwriter and record producer. In early 1984, his single "Break My Stride" hit No. 2 on the Cash Box chart and No. 5 on the Billboard Hot 100. He also wrote the music for the Disney animated feature film Mulan and provided the singing voice for the character Ling.

Early life
Born in New York City, Wilder graduated from the New Lincoln School.

Career

Wilder was one-half of the Greenwich Village folk rock group Matthew & Peter in the 1970s. In 1978, he moved to Los Angeles, and sang for television commercials and as a backing vocalist for Rickie Lee Jones and Bette Midler.

Wilder's debut album, I Don't Speak the Language (1983), reached No. 49 on the Billboard 200, fueled by "Break My Stride".  Wilder had some continued success with the single "The Kid's American", which reached No. 33 in 1984, but the single failed to match the success of "Break My Stride".  Wilder's second album, Bouncin' Off the Walls (1984), failed to gain much momentum — even with an innovative music video for the single "Bouncin' Off the Walls" —  with only the title track making the charts (No. 52), and was subsequently deemed a commercial failure.

Despite the downturn in his solo career, Wilder continued his career in the music industry as a songwriter and as a record producer for such acts as No Doubt (the hit album Tragic Kingdom), 702, Christina Aguilera, Kelly Clarkson, Miley Cyrus on her Hannah Montana song "G.N.O. (Girls Night Out)", The Belle Brigade, King Charles, and Joanna Pacitti. He has also done production work on Australian singer-songwriter Mig Ayesa's self-titled album released in April 2007 and has helped with production on Hayden Panettiere's unreleased album.

For the Disney film Mulan, Wilder co-wrote the songs with lyricist David Zippel. Wilder also lent his singing voice to the character of Ling. He won an Annie Award nomination for Music in an Animated Feature Production, and was nominated for an Academy Award for Best Original Musical or Comedy Score (along with David Zippel and Jerry Goldsmith) for his work on that film.

For theatre, Wilder once again paired with Zippel to provide the music and lyrics for Princesses, a musical comedy update of Frances Hodgson Burnett's novel A Little Princess.  The production ran at the 5th Avenue Theatre in Seattle in 2003.

Discography

Solo albums
I Don't Speak the Language (1983)
Bouncin' Off the Walls (1984)
Especially on Birthdays (2021)

With Matthew & Peter
Under the Arch (1972, with Matthew & Peter)

Singles

Filmography

References

External links
 
 

Living people
American male pop singers
American male singer-songwriters
American new wave musicians
Annie Award winners
Columbia Records artists
Epic Records artists
Male new wave singers
People from Manhattan
Record producers from New York (state)
Singer-songwriters from New York (state)
Singers from New York City
Synth-pop new wave musicians
1953 births